The Lockheed Martin X-44A is an unmanned aerial vehicle (UAV) technology demonstrator built by the Lockheed Martin Skunk Works.

Development
After the 1999 cancellation of the RQ-3 Darkstar, Lockheed Martin decided to build a technology demonstrator for a potential family of flying wing UAVs that could be used for combat and non-combat roles. The resulting X-44A (although apparently unrelated to the previously developed X-44 MANTA) was built in 1999 and first flew in 2001, representing an interim design between the Darkstar and P-175 Polecat. However, Lockheed Martin kept the X-44A under wraps until February 2018.

Design
The X-44A is reportedly made from nano-carbon fiber and is powered by a Williams F122 turbofan engine.

Display

The X-44A is currently on display at the National Museum of the US Air Force, near Dayton, Ohio, in the Research and Development gallery housed in Building 4.

See also

References

X-44
Tailless aircraft
Unmanned stealth aircraft